Windham Airport  is a public airport located three miles (5 km) northeast of the central business district of Willimantic, a city in Windham County, Connecticut, United States. It is owned by the Connecticut Airport Authority. It is included in the Federal Aviation Administration (FAA) National Plan of Integrated Airport Systems for 2017–2021, in which it is categorized as a local general aviation facility.

Although most U.S. airports use the same three-letter location identifier for the FAA and IATA, Windham Airport is assigned IJD by the FAA but has no designation from the IATA.

Facilities and aircraft 

For the 12-month period ending October 1, 2005, the airport had 30,690 aircraft operations, an average of 84 per day: 98% general aviation, 2% air taxi and <1% military. In 2005, there were 67 aircraft based at this airport: 93% single engine and 7% multi-engine.

Rentable aircraft include Cessna 152s and 172s, Piper Warriors, and a Piper Arrow.

A flight school is located on the airport, and offers training in several different types, including a Cessna 150, a Cessna 172, and a Piper 28.

Climate

References

External links 
Windham Airport

Airports in Connecticut
Connecticut Airport Authority
Transportation buildings and structures in Windham County, Connecticut
Transportation in Windham, Connecticut